HMHB may refer to:

 Half Man Half Biscuit, English rock band 
 National Healthy Mothers, Healthy Babies Coalition